Giorgos Theodoridis (born 3 July 1980) is a Greek former professional footballer.

References

1980 births
Living people
Footballers from Frankfurt
Greek footballers
Greece international footballers
Greece under-21 international footballers
Association football midfielders
Super League Greece players
2. Bundesliga players
Cypriot First Division players
Aris Thessaloniki F.C. players
Athinaikos F.C. players
PAOK FC players
Panathinaikos F.C. players
Ergotelis F.C. players
FSV Frankfurt players
Panetolikos F.C. players
Apollon Limassol FC players
Greek expatriate footballers
Expatriate footballers in Cyprus
Greek expatriate sportspeople in Cyprus
Agrotikos Asteras F.C. players